Eric Jubb (born 17 January 1931), later known as Eric Lamont, is a Canadian former backstroke and freestyle swimmer. He competed in three events at the 1948 Summer Olympics.

References

External links
 

1931 births
Living people
Canadian male backstroke swimmers
Canadian male freestyle swimmers
Olympic swimmers of Canada
Swimmers at the 1948 Summer Olympics
Swimmers from Toronto
20th-century Canadian people
21st-century Canadian people